Jimmy Hargrove was a former running back in the National Football League.

Biography
Hargrove was born on November 13, 1957 in Sampson County, North Carolina. He died on October 8, 2021.

Career
Hargrove played with the Cincinnati Bengals during the 1981 NFL season. He also played with the USFL eventual champion Michigan Panthers and Los Angeles Raiders football teams, Hargrove also played with the Green Bay Packers during the 1987 NFL season.

He played at the collegiate level at Wake Forest University. He scored the go-ahead touchdown in the fourth quarter of an eventual 12-10 loss at Virginia on October 22, 1977.

See also
List of Green Bay Packers players

References

1957 births
People from Sampson County, North Carolina
Cincinnati Bengals players
Green Bay Packers players
American football running backs
Wake Forest University alumni
Wake Forest Demon Deacons football players
Living people
National Football League replacement players